Peter E. Kenmore is an American agricultural entomologist at the Food and Agriculture Organization of the United Nations (FAO).

Awards
1994 MacArthur Fellows Program

Works
"Impact of IPM Programs on Asian Agriculture", Integrated Pest Management: Dissemination and Impact, Editors Rajinder Peshin, Ashok K. Dhawan, Springer, 2009,

References

External links
"Interview with Peter Kenmore"

American entomologists
American officials of the United Nations
MacArthur Fellows
Living people
Year of birth missing (living people)